Birds Mosaic may refer to:
 Birds Mosaic (Caesarea)
 Birds Mosaic (Jerusalem)